Oscar Davis may refer to:

 Oscar Davis (baseball) (1896–1958), American baseball player
 Oscar Hirsh Davis (1914–1988), U.S. federal judge 
 Oscar Davis (American football), American football guard